Russell W. "Russ" Howard, CM, ONL (born February 19, 1956 in Midland, Ontario) is a Canadian curler and Olympic champion, based in Regina, Saskatchewan, but originally from Midland, Ontario. He lived in Moncton, New Brunswick from 2000 to 2019. Known for his gravelly voice, Howard has been to the Brier 14 times (8 as Ontario, 6 as New Brunswick), winning the title twice (both as Ontario).  He is also a two-time world champion, winning in 1987 and 1993. He has also won three TSN Skins Games in 1991, 1992, and 1993, and participated in two Canadian Mixed Curling Championships in 2000 and 2001. He won gold at the 2006 Winter Olympics and two Canadian Senior Curling Championships in 2008 and 2009 finishing with a silver medal both of those years. Russ Howard was inducted into the Ontario Sports Hall of Fame in 2011. He is currently a curling analyst and commentator for TSN’s Season of Champions curling coverage.

Career
In 2005, he joined team Gushue to call the shots for Brad Gushue's team at the Canadian Olympic Trials, while he played second. Howard, along with Gushue (who throws last rocks), lead Jamie Korab and third Mark Nichols, went on to win the trials, giving them the right to represent Canada at the 2006 Winter Olympics, where they won the gold medal, defeating Finland 10–4 in the final match. It was the first time that a Canadian team had won the gold medal for men's curling. Howard, who turned 50 during the Olympics, is also the oldest Canadian to win an Olympic gold medal. The oldest person ever to win a gold medal was Robin Welsh, aged 54, who won gold in curling at the 1924 Winter Olympics.

As a skip (captain), Howard has been in three previous trials (in 1987, 1997, and 2001), but never went on to the Olympics. Howard is also the innovator of the "Moncton Rule", which evolved into the "free guard zone", part of international and Olympic rules. This makes his 2006 medal particularly significant, as it is likely that without the excitement this rule adds to the sport it would not have become an Olympic event in the 1990s.

In the 2009-10 curling season, although he played in bonspiels throughout the year, Howard did not curl in the New Brunswick Tankard due to his broadcasting commitments with The Sports Network (TSN).  Howard has been commentating curling events for TSN since 2001.

In 2006, he was inducted into the New Brunswick Sports Hall of Fame. In 2013, he was inducted into Canada's Sports Hall of Fame. He was named a Member of the Order of Canada and inducted into the WCF Hall of Fame in 2015.

Brier records
At the end of the 2009 Brier, Howard had appeared in more Briers than any other player (14), and played more games at the Brier than any other player (174). The 2012 Brier saw his brother Glenn Howard tying his record for Brier appearances and breaking his record for most career games played at the Brier. As of 2017, Russ had appeared in the second most Brier games ever, behind his brother Glenn.

Broadcasting career
Howard stepped into the broadcast booth for the first time in 2001, serving as an analyst for TSN’s coverage of the Tim Horton's Brier. Since 2008, he has been a mainstay analyst on the network, also providing colour commentary for TSN’s Season of Champions curling.

Howard handled colour commentating duties for Canada’s Olympic Broadcast Media Consortium during the Vancouver 2010 Olympic Winter Games.

Personal life
Howard's grand-aunt, Jean Thompson, was an Olympic runner. His brother, Glenn Howard, is also a well known curler. Howard's daughter, Ashley Howard, is a competitive curler and the executive director of CurlSask, the governing body of curling in Saskatchewan.

Outside of curling, Howard worked as a real estate agent for Royal LePage Atlantic, in addition to his commentator work with TSN, and as a curling coach in Switzerland. He moved to Regina, Saskatchewan in 2019 to be closer to his children.

Teams

Publications
Howard has released two books: Hurry Hard: The Russ Howard Story (2007), an autobiography that vividly describes his journey to becoming an Olympic gold medallist, and Curl to Win (2008).

References

External links
 

1956 births
Curlers from Ontario
Sportspeople from Moncton
People from Midland, Ontario
Curlers at the 2006 Winter Olympics
Curlers from New Brunswick
New Brunswick Sports Hall of Fame inductees
Olympic gold medalists for Canada
Living people
Members of the Order of Newfoundland and Labrador
Members of the Order of Canada
World curling champions
Curling broadcasters
Brier champions
Olympic curlers of Canada
Olympic medalists in curling
Medalists at the 2006 Winter Olympics
Canadian curling coaches
Canadian male curlers
Continental Cup of Curling participants
Canada Cup (curling) participants
Curlers from Regina, Saskatchewan